The 2005 World Junior Table Tennis Championships were held in Linz, Austria, from 10 to 17 December 2005. It was organised by the Österreichischer Tischtennis Verband under the auspices and authority of the International Table Tennis Federation (ITTF).

Medal summary

Events

Medal table

See also

2005 World Table Tennis Championships

References

World Junior Table Tennis Championships
World Junior Table Tennis Championships
World Junior Table Tennis Championships
World Junior Table Tennis Championships
Table tennis competitions in Austria
International sports competitions hosted by Austria
World Junior Table Tennis Championships